Will Bernard is a guitarist and band leader. He has led the Will Bernard Band, Will Bernard Trio, Will Bernard 4-tet, and Motherbug.

Career
In the 1980s Bernard was a member of the Hieroglyphics Ensemble led by Peter Apfelbaum. In the 1990s he formed the band T. J. Kirk in San Francisco with Charlie Hunter and John Schott. The band's name "James T. Kirk" was taken from James Brown, Thelonious Monk, and Rahsaan Roland Kirk. Palmetto released his debut solo album, Blue Plate Special, in 2008. He has also worked with The Coup, John Ellis, John Medeski, Stanton Moore, and Jai Uttal.

Awards and honors
Grammy Award nomination, If Four Was One, 1997

Discography

As leader
 Medicine Hat (Antilles, 1998)
 Motherbug (Dreck to Disk, 2000)
 Directions to My House (Dreck to Disk, 2005)
 Party Hats (Palmetto, 2007)
 Blue Plate Special (Palmetto, 2008)
 Night for Day (Bju, 2008)
 Outdoor Living (Dreck to Disk, 2012)
 Just Like Downtown (Posi-Tone, 2013)
 Out and About (Posi-Tone, 2016)
 Freelance Subversives (Ropeadope, 2020)
 Ancient Grains (Posi-Tone, 2021)

With T.J. Kirk 
 T.J. Kirk (Warner Bros., 1995)
 If Four Was One (Warner Bros., 1996)
 Talking Only Makes It Worse (Ropeadope, 2003)

As sideman
With Peter Apfelbaum
 Signs of Life ([Antilles, 1991)
 Jodoji Brightness (Antilles, 1992)
 Luminous Charms (Gramavision, 1996)
 It Is Written (ACT, 2005)

With Stanton Moore
 III (Telarc, 2006)
 Emphasis! (On Parenthesis) (Telarc, 2008)
 Groove Alchemy (Telarc, 2010)

With Ben Sidran
 Don't Cry For No Hipster (Nardis, 2012)
 Picture Him Happy (Nardis, 2017)

With Jai Uttal
 Beggars and Saints (Triloka, 1994)
 Shiva Station (Triloka, 1997)

With others
 Steven Bernstein, Diaspora Suite (Tzadik, 2008)
 Anthony Brown, Rhapsodies (Water Baby, 2005)
 Don Cherry, Multikulti (A&M, 1990)
 Spearhead, Home (Capitol, 1994)
 Trance Mission, Trance Mission (City of Tribes, 1993)
 Tom Waits, Bad as Me (Anti-, 2011)
 Robert Walter, Giving Up the Ghost (Magna Carta, 2003)

References

External links 
Official site

Living people
Jazz-funk guitarists
American funk guitarists
American male guitarists
American jazz guitarists
Palmetto Records artists
Posi-Tone Records artists
20th-century American guitarists
20th-century American male musicians
American male jazz musicians
Year of birth missing (living people)